Aberscross Castle was a castle near the deserted village at Aberscross, near Dornoch, Highland in Scotland.

History
The castle was once the home of Murrays of Aberscross, who settled in the area during the late 12th century. The castle was ruinous by the 17th century. No ruins are located above ground.

Notes

Citations

References

Ruined castles in Highland (council area)
Clan Murray